The 39M Csaba (t͡ʃɒbɒ) was a Hungarian armoured car designed by Nicholas Straussler. It was produced for the Royal Hungarian Army during World War II and used extensively on the Eastern Front fighting against the Soviet Union.

Development 

Hungarian expatriate Nicholas Straussler designed several armoured cars for Britain while living there between the two world wars. Straussler came to an agreement with the Weiss Manfred factory of Csepel, Budapest to produce vehicles from his designs for use in his home country – the most prominent was the Csaba (named after the son of Attila the Hun) which was designed based on his experience of the Alvis AC2 armoured car.

After successful trials in 1939, the Hungarian Army placed an order for 61, and a further order for an additional 40 vehicles was placed in 1940. Of these, twenty were used as actual fighting vehicles, with the remainder serving as armoured command cars and reconnaissance vehicles.

The Csaba had a 20 mm Solothurn anti-tank cannon and a coaxial 8 mm Gebauer 1934/37M machine gun fixed on a centrally mounted turret, with 9 mm armoured plating. The 20 mm cannon had 200 shells in 5 shell capacity magazines, for a total of 40 magazines, meanwhile the coaxial 8 mm Gebauer machine gun had 3000 rounds in 100 round metal belts. The vehicle was also equipped with a detachable 8 mm Solothurn light machine gun fired through the rear hatch in the anti-aircraft role. The crew could dismount and carry this LMG when conducting reconnaissance on foot. It also had two driving positions – one at the front as normal, and an additional one at the rear.

The 40M Csaba was a command version armed only with the turret-mounted 8 mm machine gun. This vehicle was fitted with a second R-4T radio, which had a large lattice radio mast.

Gallery

References

Notes

Bibliography

External links 

World War II armoured cars
Armoured fighting vehicles of Hungary
Military vehicles introduced in the 1930s

SPGs. SPAs. Armored cars and trucks of 1939